Vassar is an unincorporated community in Osage County, Kansas, United States. As of the 2020 census, the population of the community and nearby areas was 584.

History
A post office was opened in La Mont's Hill (an extinct town) in 1871, but it was moved to Vassar in 1887.   Vassar still has a post office with ZIP code 66543.

The Missouri Pacific Railroad previously went through Vassar, but it was abandoned, then later it was converted into the Flint Hills Nature Trail.

Geography

Climate
The climate in this area is characterized by hot, humid summers and generally mild to cool winters.  According to the Köppen Climate Classification system, Vassar has a humid subtropical climate, abbreviated "Cfa" on climate maps.

Demographics

For statistical purposes, the United States Census Bureau has defined this community as a census-designated place (CDP).

References

Further reading

External links
 Osage County maps: Current, Historic, KDOT

Census-designated places in Osage County, Kansas